Babruysk Arena, also known as Bobruisk Arena, is an indoor sporting arena located in Babruysk, Belarus.  It serves as the home of Shinnik Bobruisk of the Belarusian Extraliga.  The arena seats 7,151 spectators and opened in 2008.

External links
Official website
President attends ceremony of inauguration of new ice arena in Bobruisk
Rink boom in Belarus

Indoor arenas in Belarus